Elio Chacón Rodríguez (October 26, 1936 – April 24, 1992) was a Major League Baseball second baseman and shortstop who played in the National League from 1960 to 1962. He was the seventh baseball player from Venezuela to play in the majors.

Early baseball career
He threw and batted right-handed. Chacón hit .265 as a reserve second baseman with the  NL champion Cincinnati Reds, starting 34 games during the season. In Game 2 of the 1961 World Series, Chacón hit a key bloop single against New York Yankees pitcher Ralph Terry, and scored the winning run in the Reds' only victory in the series.

Immediately after the World Series, on October 10, the 1961 MLB expansion draft to stock the newborn Houston Colt .45s and New York Mets was conducted in Cincinnati. After he was selected by New York with the fourth overall pick during the draft's regular phase, Chacón was the Mets' first candidate for the  starting shortstop job. In a May 28 game, Chacón got into a fight with Willie Mays. Chacón was ejected from the game.

'¡La tengo!'
During the 1962 season, New York Mets center fielder Richie Ashburn and Chacón frequently found themselves colliding in the outfield. When Ashburn went for a catch, he would scream, "I got it! I got it!" only to run into the 160-pound Chacón, who spoke only Spanish. Ashburn learned to yell, "¡La tengo! ¡La tengo!" which is "I've got it" in Spanish. In a later game, Ashburn happily saw Chacón backing off. He relaxed, positioned himself to catch the ball, and was instead run over by 200-pound left fielder Frank Thomas, who understood no Spanish and had missed a team meeting that proposed using the words "¡La tengo!" as a way to avoid outfield collisions. After getting up, Thomas asked Ashburn, "What the hell is a Yellow Tango?". The band, Yo La Tengo, gets its name from this baseball anecdote.

He led the Mets in stolen bases in their inaugural season of 1962, but then never appeared in the major leagues again. His professional career continued through 1971. In the majors, Chacón was a .232 career hitter with 143 hits, four home runs, 28 RBI, 49 runs, and 20 stolen bases in 228 games played.

Elio Chacón died in Caracas at the age of 55.

See also
 List of players from Venezuela in Major League Baseball

References

External links

Retrosheet
Venezuelan Professional baseball League

1936 births
1992 deaths
Águilas del Zulia players
Baseball players at the 1955 Pan American Games
Broncos de Reynosa players
Buffalo Bisons (minor league) players
Cincinnati Reds players
Denver Bears players
Havana Sugar Kings players
Industriales de Valencia players
Jacksonville Suns players
Licoreros de Pampero players
Major League Baseball infielders
Major League Baseball players from Venezuela
Mexican League baseball players
New York Mets players
Pan American Games bronze medalists for Venezuela
Pan American Games medalists in baseball
Portland Beavers players
Savannah Redlegs players
Baseball players from Caracas
Tiburones de La Guaira players
Tigres de Aragua players
Tulsa Oilers (baseball) players
Venezuelan expatriate baseball players in Mexico
Venezuelan expatriate baseball players in the United States
Medalists at the 1955 Pan American Games
Venezuelan expatriate baseball players in Cuba